Plica neuropathica, also known as felted hair, is a curling, looping, intertwisting, and felting or matting of the hair in localized areas of the scalp.

References

Conditions of the skin appendages
Human hair
Hair diseases